The men's shot put event at the 2021 European Athletics Indoor Championships was held on 5 March at 11:18 (qualification) and at 20:35 (final) local time.

Medalists

Records

Results

Qualification
Qualification: Qualifying performance 21.00 (Q) or at least 8 best performers (q) advance to the Final.

Final

References

2021 European Athletics Indoor Championships
Shot put at the European Athletics Indoor Championships